A drawn file is a type of file used to preserve image drawings. The filename extension for this is .drawn, .drawing, or, for computers that only support three-letter extensions, .drw.

Programs
According to FileInfo.net  files with a .drw extension can be opened by the following programs:

Mac OS 	 
 Apple AppleWorks

Windows
 Microsoft Picture It!
 CorelDRAW
 Corel Paint Shop Pro

References

Graphics file formats